Legends South, formerly Robert Taylor Homes, is a neighborhood located in the Grand Boulevard Community Area on the South side of Chicago, Illinois.

The neighborhood used to be named after the Chicago housing development, Robert Taylor Homes, that once took up most of the area. The buildings were overrun with crime and fell into disrepair. They were demolished in 2007. The area is now being redeveloped as Legends South with a mixed-income community in low-rise buildings as part of a federal block grant received for the purpose from the HOPE VI federal program.

Parks
Metcalfe Park
Taylor Park

Education
Bronzeville Lighthouse CHTR
Howalton School
Safe Schools Alternative High School
Beethoven
ACE Technical Chtr HS

Housing developments
Hansberry Square
Savoy Square

References

External links
 Legends South

Neighborhoods in Chicago
Populated places established in 1962